Larrea is a hamlet and concejo located in the municipality of Barrundia, in Álava province, Basque Country, Spain.

Notable people
Juan Pérez de Lazarraga (1548–1605), author of an early manuscript in Basque

References

External links
 

Concejos in Barrundia